ARCore, also known as Google Play Services for AR, is a software development kit developed by Google that allows for augmented reality applications to be built.

ARCore uses three key technologies to integrate virtual content with the real world as seen through the camera of a smartphone or tablet:

 Six degrees of freedom allows the phone to understand and track its position relative to the world.
 Environmental understanding allows the phone to detect the size and location of flat horizontal surfaces like the ground or a coffee table.
 Light estimation allows the phone to estimate the environment's current lighting conditions.

ARCore has been integrated into a multitude of devices.

References

External links
 

Google software
Software development kits
Computer-related introductions in 2018
3D imaging
Augmented reality